La via dei babbuini is a  1974  Italian commedia all'italiana film written and directed by Luigi Magni.

Plot   
Fiorenza, a young bourgeois woman, lives in Rome with her husband Orazio. The marriage of the two is already quite saturated, even if not outwardly broken: this situation depends as much on the deliberate absence of children, as on psychological and social elements that the two spouses perceive unconsciously and differently. Fiorenza, who has rushed to Massawa to assist her father, an old colonialist she has never even known, sees him die and bury. Left alone, she does not return to her homeland but lets herself be guided by the extravagant Getulio to discover the African mystery. Horace, a cultured man but suffering from chronic infantilism, joins his wife and tries to tear her away from the continent that is almost plagiarizing her. But Fiorenza, after the tragic death of Getulio, goes towards the savannah following the path of the baboons who, unlike men, go up to the plants where the secret of their genuine nature is found.

Cast 
 Catherine Spaak as Fiorenza 
 Pippo Franco as  Getulio
 Fabio Garriba as  Orazio
 Lionel Stander as  Fiorenza's father 
 Rita Calderoni  
 Ada Pometti

See also    
 List of Italian films of 1974

References

External links

1974 films
Commedia all'italiana
Films directed by Luigi Magni
Films scored by Armando Trovajoli
1970s Italian films